Gračanica is a village in Serbia. It is situated in the Ljubovija municipality, in the Mačva District of Central Serbia. The population of the village in 2002 was 465, all of whom were ethnic Serbs.

Historical population

1948: 990
1953: 1,160
1961: 1,096
1971: 711
1981: 630
1991: 536
2002: 465

References

See also
Populated places in Serbia

Populated places in Mačva District
Ljubovija